may refer to:

Places
Ichikawa, Chiba, a city in Chiba, Japan
Ichikawa Gakuen (Ichikawa Junior and Senior High School), a large private boys and girls school in Moto-kita-kata, Ichikawa, Chiba
Ichikawa, Hyogo, a town in Hyōgo, Japan
Ichikawamisato, frequently known simply as Ichikawa, a city in Yamanashi, Japan
Ichi River, a river in Hyōgo Prefecture

Other uses
Ichikawa (surname)